Woken River, is a river in the Chinese province of Heilongjiang.

References

Rivers of Heilongjiang